Rao Suja Ji Rathore ( 1492–1515) was a ruler of Marwar. He was a son of Jodha, brother of Satal. On his death, there was a short struggle for the throne between his grandsons Biram Singh and Ganga, which the latter won.

Family

Consort: 
 Rani Bhatiyani Sarangdeji ( née Likhmibai) – daughter of Bhati Kalikaran — She was a granddaughter of Raval Kehar of Jaisalmer and sister of Bhati Jeso, founder of Jeso Sakh of Marwar Bhati.
 Rani Chauhanji – daughter of Sacoro Chauhan Rav Pithamrav of Sacor.
 Rani Mangliyani Sarvandeji – daughter of Mangliyo Gahlot Rana Patu.
 Rani Sankhli Sahodharamji

Issue

Sons: 
 Sekha – with daughter of Rao Pithamrav — Eldest son of Rao Suja. He was hostile towards Rao Ganga and Rao Maldeo. He descendants are the Sekhavat Rathors.
 Bagha (   7 December 1457,Marwar;  3 September 1514, Jodhpur, Marwar) – with Sarandeji — He was elected successor by Rao Suja but died during Suja's lifetime. His son, Ganga became the Rao of Marwar. 
 Nara – with Sarandeji — He founded Naravat sakh of Marwar Rathors.
 Devidas – with daughter of Rao Pithamrav 
Son of rao devidas ji are Rao harraj ji and Rao Panchayan ji in present day his descendants are head of thikanas- Bawadikheda , Bisoniya, Jhadpiplya,Aagriya, Molkya. The present are descendant Rao Narayan Singh ji rathore of Bawadikheda(Dongargaon) Thikana
 Uda (  16 November 1542;  12 May 1511, Jaitaran) – with Sarvandeji — He conquered Jaitaran and had built a fort there. His descendants are the Udavat Rathors. 
 Pirag – with Sarvandeji
 Sanga – with Sarvandeji
 Prithiraj – with Sahodramji
 Napo – with Sahodramji

Daughters: 
 Khetubai – She was married to Hada Rao Narandas of Bundi and mother of Rao Surajmal of Bundi.

References

15th-century Indian monarchs
16th-century Indian monarchs
Monarchs of Marwar
Year of birth missing
1515 deaths